is a Japanese professional footballer who plays as a goalkeeper for J1 League club Cerezo Osaka.

Club statistics

Honours and awards

Team
 J. League Cup - 2008

References

External links
Profile at Cerezo Osaka

1988 births
Living people
Association football people from Hyōgo Prefecture
Japanese footballers
J1 League players
J2 League players
Japan Football League players
Oita Trinita players
Giravanz Kitakyushu players
Avispa Fukuoka players
Kyoto Sanga FC players
Cerezo Osaka players
Association football goalkeepers